Edison Chen Koon-hei (born Chen Hing-wah on 7 October 1980) is a Chinese-born Canadian actor, singer, rapper, fashion designer and entrepreneur. Chen is the co-founder of CLOT, a Hong Kong-based streetwear and fashion label. Debuting in 1999, he released multiple Cantopop and Mandopop albums under the record company Emperor Entertainment Group, before releasing Please Steal This Album in 2004, the first of many Chinese-language hip-hop albums.

On 21 February 2008, he publicly announced that he intended to step away "indefinitely" from the Hong Kong entertainment industry due to a sex photo scandal, in which numerous explicit photographs of Chen and several Hong Kong actresses were published online. He returned in 2010 but other than a brief cameo in the 2014 film Golden Chickensss, he did not make a complete comeback to the Hong Kong film industry until 2016.

Early life
Along with his two older sisters, Chen was born in Vancouver, British Columbia, Canada, and is of Chinese and one-eighth Portuguese descent. Chen's father is businessman Edward Chen (陳澤民), a Hong Kong entertainment industry mogul famously known as "Ninth Brother" (九哥). He is of Shanghai ancestry on his father's side.

He was a student at R.C. Palmer Secondary School in Richmond, British Columbia and also attended Hong Kong International School. He was in the same tenth grade class as fellow actor Nicholas Tse.

Chen's native language is English. He is also fluent in Cantonese and Mandarin, which he primarily records music in. He speaks conversational Japanese as a result of his early training to be a Hong Kong idol, and he knows some basic Khmer since he learnt it when portraying a Cambodian assassin in the 2006 Hong Kong movie Dog Bite Dog.

Career

Film
In 1999, a talent scout approached Chen while he was clubbing with friends in Hong Kong and asked him to film a commercial. He was aged 19 when he was featured in Leon Lai's Citibank commercial. In the same year, he also starred alongside Cecilia Cheung in a commemorative subway commercial.

From then on, his career began with the Japanese film Dead or Alive 2: Birds. He made his Hong Kong film debut in the film Gen-Y Cops in 2000. He starred in many popular films including Infernal Affairs, Infernal Affairs II, Initial D, and Dog Bite Dog. Determined to expand his horizons to countries around the world, he also starred in the Japanese drama Under the Same Moon. In 2006, he made his American debut as a Hong Kong journalist in The Grudge 2. He was offered a small role in The Fast and the Furious: Tokyo Drift but he declined. His final film in Hong Kong as of 2013 is The Sniper, which was filmed before his photo scandal.

He also filmed a cameo as a thug in The Dark Knight but because of the scandal, his role was reduced and was seen very briefly as a receptionist instead. Some reports states that he was originally cast to play Lau, a corrupted Chinese accountant, which was played by Chin Han. He made his comeback in an Asian-American film called Almost Perfect. On 28 October, during a fashion event in Beijing, Edison Chen announced that he would be starring in Initial D 2. The filming of the movie was scheduled to begin in 2011 but it has been delayed indefinitely. In 2014, he made an brief comeback to the Hong Kong film industry in Golden Chickensss. After eight years of doing short roles, he is officially making a comeback to the entertainment business after he was spotted filming for Lou Ye's new project in Guangzhou in April 2016.

Music
In 2000, at the age of 20, Chen landed a record deal with Emperor Entertainment Group.  It took him a number of successful album releases before he was given the opportunity to produce a hip hop album. His first hip-hop release was in February 2004, called Please Steal This Album backed by MC Yan and Singaporean musician Hanjin Chen. Several singles from the album topped local pop charts. Chen mentioned the difficulty of fitting in Hong Kong, where it is dominated by Cantopop, but said that hip hop has a great potential.

He is featured on M-Flo's album, Cosmicolor, on the track "LOVE ME, HATE THE GAME" with Chen, Thaitanium and Ryohei Yamamoto.

After Chen's comeback in late 2009 he began work on his next album titled Confusion. The record includes a feature by well-known Taiwanese rapper MC HotDog, as well as famous singers Sammi Cheng and Jay Chou.

Chen released two Cantonese hip-hop albums in collaboration with Hong Kong rappers MC Yan and Chef entitled 三角度 (3 Corners) and 三角度(二) (3 Corners II) in 2012 and 2015 respectively.

Fashion and business founder
Edison's foray into the fashion industry accompanied his rising success as a young pop icon. Edison, along with partners Kevin Poon and Billy Ip, became the founders of CLOT Inc., a clothing company described as a "lifestyle company" that is geared toward youth culture, and bringing street fashion to China. The company has collaborated with many big clothing companies, such as Adidas, Nike, A Bathing Ape, Subcrew and Disney. CLOT operates multiple stores worldwide, including in Hong Kong, Los Angeles, mainland China and Taiwan. He is also part founder of clothing vendor JUICE, currently operating in Hong Kong, Shanghai a

Multimedia company
In February 2007, he invested $10 million HKD to open his own multi-media company, Clot Media Division, which plans to produce movies, commercials and music albums. In June 2007, he released a Mandarin album, Allow Me to Re-Introduce Myself (讓我再次介紹我自己), with tracks produced by legendary hip-hop artist Kanye West, as well as producers Just Blaze and Clinton Sparks.

Community work
As early as 2001 Chen had appeared in Vancouver charity shows. He has also been a supporter for the gay and lesbian community in Hong Kong, including being voted as an icon in 2001.

In 2007 he was invited by Be@rbrick toys for a charity event in Harbour City, Hong Kong. The charity proceeds were donated to "Hong Kong Blood Cancer Foundation".

Video game voice work
He provided English and Cantonese voice work as a Sun On Yee triad member (inspired by the real life triad Sun Yee On) named Jackie Ma, a major character in the 2012 open world action-adventure video game Sleeping Dogs originally released on PC, PlayStation 3 and Xbox 360. Sleeping Dogs is set in the city of Hong Kong, and also features voice work from other established actors including Will Yun Lee, Emma Stone and Lucy Liu.

Incidents

2004 victim of assault
In March 2004, two male teenagers assaulted Chen in the Central District of Hong Kong. The two teenagers mocked Chen with dance moves outside a record store. Immediately following the dance taunt, both of the teenagers punched Chen. Upon doing so the two teenagers fled the scene, and Chen gave chase. Chen eventually caught up to the two individuals as they were trying to board a bus. They were turned over to Hong Kong Police. As a result of the incident, Chen reported that he sprained his ankle and that his cheekbone and ear were also injured. Chen declined to press charges and the two individuals were released.

2007 taxi incident
Chen drove to his home after midnight 9 March 2007. The gate was blocked by a Toyota Crown Comfort taxi that had just dropped off its passengers. The taxi driver then signaled Chen to move away so he could pull out, clearing the way for Chen to enter.  Chen's security guard told the taxi driver to pull over so that Chen could pass. The taxi driver insulted the security guard. Chen proceeded to have an argument with the taxi driver.  Despite the presence of the security guard and other witnesses, he got out of his car and kicked the taxi several times, denting it and breaking all its windows. He was subsequently charged by the police. On the basis of these charges he was convicted and placed on a one-year good behavior bond. He was also fined; the taxi company was granted HK$4,700 in compensation for the damage inflicted to the car.

2008 photo scandal 

In January 2008, Chen was involved in a widely publicised sex scandal when sexually explicit nude photographs of himself taken four years earlier became widely circulated on the Internet. Chen was never accused of uploading the photos himself and a computer technician was later sentenced for accessing Chen's computer during a repair. Celebrities implicated in the scandal included 8 victims: Cecilia Cheung, Gillian Chung, Bobo Chan, Candice Chan (陈思慧), Vincy Yeung (杨永晴), Mandy Chen (陈育嬬) and Rachel Ngan (颜颖思). Nude photos of Edison's ex-girlfriend, Vincy Yeung, were also made public and the future of their relationship was the subject of intense media gossip.

Hong Kong police have stated that they confiscated a collection of sex-related photos that involve six other identifiable females and other unidentifiable males.

Initially the authenticity of the photos was denied, and digital manipulation was used as the primary explanation for the pictures. However, Hong Kong police and Photoshop experts argued that the photos were in fact real and not digitally altered. This brought about a serious reaction towards all parties involved in the scandal. As a result, Chen made a public apology in English to the Hong Kong people and the women involved and indirectly admitted his role and expressed remorse and subsequently announced his indefinite departure from the Hong Kong entertainment industry at a press conference.

Due to the scandal, the Google search engine rankings for 2008 resulted in Chen's Chinese name being the number 1 search term in China, and number 3 in Taiwan. Chen was runner-up to US president-elect Barack Obama in the Hong Kong Person of 2008 poll by government-run RTHK radio, with just under 30 percent of votes in the Person of the Year. On 1 June 2009, Chen spoke openly about the sex photo scandal for the first time since the scandal broke in an interview with TalkAsia on CNN. In the interview he reveals his side of the scandal and how he endured criticisms from the public, the media, and from the individuals affected by the case.

2011 photo scandal 
Three years later, Chen was involved in another photo scandal, this time with a 16-year-old Hong Kong model Cammi Tse. Their relationship was revealed after photos of them together hugging and kissing each other were leaked online and later, the 16-year-old model stated that her phone was lost. It was later revealed that Chen had sent text messages to Tse, asking her to pose for him in swimsuits and school uniforms. Tse confirmed that there were no nude photos. Tse reported that she lost her virginity to Chen and adding on that he filmed a two-minute video of her in the bedroom and he also bought sexy lingerie for her.

Personal life
In 2015, Chen went into a relationship with Chinese model and actress Qin Shupei. In August 2017, Chen confirmed the birth of his daughter, Alaia.

As of 2021, Chen currently resides in Los Angeles, California with his wife and daughter.

Discography

Filmography

Films
 2000 – Dead or Alive 2: Birds (Dead or Alive 2: 逃亡者) (Japan)
 2000 – Gen Y Cops (特警新人類2)
 2001 – Final Romance (願望樹)
 2001 – Dummy mother, Without a Baby (玉女添丁)
 2001 – Dance of a Dream (愛君如夢)
 2002 – Princess D (想飛)
 2002 – Nine Girls and a Ghost (九個女仔一隻鬼)
 2002 – Infernal Affairs (無間道)
 2003 – The Twins Effect (千機變)
 2003 – The Medallion (飛龍再生) (Cameo)
 2003 – Infernal Affairs II (無間道II)
 2003 – The Spy Dad (絕種鐵金剛)
 2003 – Infernal Affairs III (無間道III: 終極無間) (Cameo)
 2004 – Sex and the Beauties (性感都市)
 2004 – Moving Targets (2004 新紮師兄)
 2004 – Life, Translated (時差7小時)
 2004 – Jiang Hu (江湖)
 2004 – The Twins Effect II (千機變)
 2004 – A-1 Headline (A-1 頭條)
 2005 – Initial D (頭文字D)
 2005 – Under The Same Moon (同じ月を見ている) (Japan)
 2006 – Dog Bite Dog (狗咬狗)
 2006 – The Grudge 1.5 (咒怨1.5) (Short)
 2006 – The Grudge 2 (咒怨2)
 2007 – Trivial Matters (破事兒)
 2008 – The Dark Knight (Cameo)
 2009 – The Sniper (神鎗手)
 2009 – Coweb (戰無雙) (Cameo)
 2012 – Almost Perfect
 2014 – Golden Chicken 3 (金雞SSS)
 2014 – Streets of Macao
 2015 – Waiting
 2016 – Good Take, Too!
 2019 – The Shadow Play
 TBA – Initial D 2 (頭文字D 2)

Voiceovers
 2001 – Cats & Dogs (貓狗鬥一番) (Voice only, Cantonese version)
 2007 – Shrek the Third (史力加之咁就三世) (Voice only, Cantonese version)
 2012 – Sleeping Dogs (香港秘密警察)

TV series
2002 – Feel 100% (百分百感覺)
2003 – Hearts of Fencing (當四葉草碰上劍尖時) Guest
2005 – Eight Heroes (八大豪俠)

Awards

Film and TV Awards
2001 – 20th Hong Kong Film Awards – Nominee – Best New Performer for Gen-Y Cops
2003 – China Fashion Awards – Winner – Character Figure 
 2003 – Star Fighter Super Festival – Creative Breakthrough Actor Award (winner)
2004 – China Fashion Awards – Winner – Asia Breakthrough Artist

Music Awards

2000–2001
2000 – Jade Solid Gold Best Ten Music Awards – Winner – Most Popular New Artist (Male) (dual gold with Louis Koo)  
2001 – Jade Solid Gold Best Ten Music Awards Winner – 4 Stations Best Song/Four Channel Award (silver)
2001 – TVB8 Mandarin Music Awards – Winner – Top 10 Songs/Winner – Best New Singer

2002
2002 – Jade Solid Gold Best Ten Music Awards – Winner – Favorite Online Song – I never told you (bronze)
2002 – RTHK Top 10 Gold Songs Awards – Winner – Best Song 
2002 – CMA Chinese Music Awards – Winner – Favorite New Singer  
2002 – Top Chinese Music Awards – Winner – Outstanding New Singer
2002 – Music Pioneer Chart Awards – Winner – Favorite Singer 
2002 – TVB8 Mandarin Music Awards – Winner – Best Song

2003
2003 – MusicRadio China TOP Ranking Chart – Winner – Gold Song 
2003 – Metro Radio Hits Music Awards Presentation – Best Original Song – Number Nine
2003 – Guoyuli Awards Ceremony – Best Singer
2003 – Guoyuli Awards Ceremony – Best Song – "I Never Told You"

2004
2004 – Music Pioneer Chart Awards – Winner – Favorite Singer  
2004 – Jade Solid Gold Best Ten Music Awards – Winner – Outstanding Performance

2005
2005 – 5th Chinese Music Media Awards Best Hip Hop artist (winner)

2006
2006 – 6th Chinese Music Media Awards Best Hip Hop artist (winner)

2011
2011 – Golden Melody Awards – Nominee – Best Music Video – Mr. Sandman

Special Awards
 2000 – East TOUCH magazine – Sportsman cable female election (nomination)
 2000 – East TOUCH magazine Best newcomer (winner)
 2007 – BQ Celebrity Score Awards – Nominee – Best Fashion Artist
 2007 – Sina "2007 Guangdong Ten Network Entertainment festival" Best Fashion Music Artists (winner)
 2011 – MTV Super Festival Annual Trend of Most Style Artist Award (winner)

Notes

References

External links
Edison Chen's Official Blog

1980 births
21st-century Hong Kong male actors
Businesspeople from Vancouver
Canadian emigrants to Hong Kong
Canadian people of Hong Kong descent
Canadian people of Portuguese descent
Canadian male voice actors
Cantopop singers
Hong Kong male film actors
Hong Kong film producers
Hong Kong male singers
Hong Kong Mandopop singers
Hong Kong male models
Hong Kong people of Portuguese descent
Hong Kong male rappers
Hong Kong record producers
Hong Kong male television actors
Living people
Male actors from Vancouver
Mandopop singers
Musicians from Vancouver
People with acquired permanent residency of Hong Kong
Canadian-born Hong Kong artists